A vulture is a large scavenging bird of prey.

Vulture, Vultures, etc., may also refer to:

Arts, entertainment, and media

Fictional entities
 Vulture (DC Comics), a fictional criminal organization, as well as five unrelated characters
 Vulture, a DC Comics character, member of the Terrible Trio
 Vulture (Marvel Comics), several supervillain characters

Films
 The Vulture (1937 film), a British comedy
 The Vulture (1967 film), a British horror film
 The Vulture (1981 film), an Israeli movie by Yaky Yosha
 The Vulture (1982 film), a Hungarian crime film
 The Vultures (1975 film), a Quebec film
 The Vultures (1984 film), a French adventure film

Literature
 "Vultures" (poem), by Chinua Achebe
 "The Vulture" (short story), a short story by Franz Kafka
The Vulture, a 1970 book by Gil Scott-Heron

Music

Groups and labels
 The Vultures (band), 2010s alternative group 
 The Vultures, a 1970s R&B group featuring Joe Strummer

Albums
 Vultures (AxeWound album), 2012
 Vultures (EP), released in 2015 by Disciple
 Vultures (Smile Empty Soul album), 2006
 Vultures, a 2013 album by Dozer

Songs
 "Vulture", a 1988 song by James from Strip-mine
 "Vultures", a 2000 song by The Offspring from Conspiracy of One
 "Vultures", a 2006 song by John Mayer from Continuum
 "Vultures", a 2007 song by Arch Enemy from Rise of the Tyrant
 "Vulture", a 2009 song by Patrick Wolf from The Bachelor
 "Vultures", a 2009 song by Insane Clown Posse from Bang! Pow! Boom!
 "Vultures", a 2017 song by Asking Alexandria from Asking Alexandria
 "Vultures", a 2018 song by Northlane from Alien
 "The Vulture (Acts I & II)", a 2009 song by Gallows from Grey Britain
 "The Vulture", a 2002 song by Clinic from Walking with Thee
 "The Vulture", a 2009 song by Pendulum from Immersion
 "The Vulture", a 2014 album by King Raam

Other uses in arts, entertainment, and media
 Vulture (talk show), a 2005 Australian arts talk show
 Vulture.com, a website focusing on pop culture run by New York magazine
 Vulture, a version of the computer game Falcon's Eye
 "The Vulture" (Brooklyn Nine-Nine), a television episode

Finance
 Vulture capitalist, an investor that acquires distressed firms in the hopes of making them more profitable so as to ultimately sell them for a profit
 Vulture fund, a hedge fund, private equity fund, or distressed debt fund that invests in debt considered to be very weak or in default, known as distressed securities

Places

In the United States
 Vulture Mountains, Arizona
 Vulture Mine, Arizona, a mine and a community
 Vulture Peak (Montana), Glacier National Park, Montana
 Vulture Glacier (Montana), on the southern flanks of the mountain

Elsewhere
 Vulture (region), Italy
 Monte Vulture, an extinct volcano and the namesake of the region
 Vulture Glacier (Alberta), Banff National Park, Canada
 Vulture Peak, Rajgir, Bihar, India, associated with the Buddha
 Vulture Street, Brisbane, a street in the capital city of Queensland, Australia

Sports
 Vulture, a term in baseball for some relief pitcher
 Phil Regan (baseball) (born 1937), American Major League Baseball pitcher nicknamed "The Vulture"
 Atlanta Vultures, a short-lived American Indoor Football team

Transport

Air
Vulture (South Africa UAV), a South African unmanned aerial vehicle
 DARPA Vulture, a future Boeing design for a long-endurance, high-altitude unmanned aerial vehicle
 Rolls-Royce Vulture, an aero engine developed before the Second World War
 Vickers Vulture, a version of the Vickers Viking amphibious aircraft
 Vulture 1, the record-setting Paper Aircraft Released Into Space
 Vulture II, or Boeing SolarEagle, a proposed unmanned spy plane

Marine
, various British Royal Navy ships and one Naval Air Station
, various other ships

Other uses
 Vulture (hieroglyph), Ancient Egyptian letter/sign
 Operation Vulture, a proposed 1954 American operation to rescue French forces besieged in Dien Bien Phu, Indochina
 Vulture restaurant, a site where carrion is deposited in order to be consumed by vultures

See also
 Stele of the Vultures, a monument from 2600–2350 BC in Mesopotamia celebrating a victory of the city-state of Lagash over its neighbour Umma